The Yendang or Maya languages are a group of Adamawa languages spoken in Adamawa State, eastern Nigeria.

Languages
The classification below follows Blench (2009).

Maya (Yendang)
Bali, Kpasham
Waka, Yendang (incl. Kusheki), Yoti
Teme
Gengle, Kugama, Kumba (Sate, Yofo)

Names and locations
Below is a list of language names, populations, and locations from Blench (2019).

See also
Yendang word lists (Wiktionary)

References

Roger Blench, 2004. List of Adamawa languages (ms)

 
Leko–Nimbari languages